Roger Riera Canadell (born 17 February 1995) is a Spanish professional footballer who plays as a centre-back.

Club career
Born in El Masnou, Barcelona, Catalonia, Riera joined FC Barcelona's La Masia youth system in 2005. He was named captain all every youth level at the club. He was the captain of the under-19 side that won the first UEFA Youth League competition in 2014. On 15 July 2014, he signed with English club Nottingham Forest on a two-year contract and was subsequently assigned to the youth team. After failing to break into the first team, his contract was terminated in January 2016.

On 21 January 2016, Riera joined the reserve team of Celta de Vigo on a four and a half year deal. After one season, he moved to Villarreal B on 30 June 2017.

On 27 June 2019, Riera moved abroad and joined Dutch Eerste Divisie side NAC Breda on a two-year contract. On 28 January 2021, he returned to Barça and was assigned to the reserves in Segunda División B.

On 20 July 2021, Riera signed with FC Andorra after the expiration of his contract with Barcelona. He was a backup option during the season, as the side achieved a first-ever promotion to Segunda División, but terminated his contract on 1 September 2022.

Honours
Barcelona
UEFA Youth League: 2013–14

References

External links

1995 births
Living people
Spanish footballers
Association football defenders
Primera Federación players
Segunda División B players
Eerste Divisie players
Celta de Vigo B players
Villarreal CF B players
NAC Breda players
FC Barcelona Atlètic players
FC Andorra players
Spanish expatriate footballers
Expatriate footballers in the Netherlands
Spanish expatriate sportspeople in the Netherlands